ULYZ s.p.r.l. is a Belgian shipyard and brand that designs, manufactures and markets inflatable boats and Rigid-hulled inflatable boats (RIBs). ULYZ is a popular brand among professional fishermen and boat enthusiasts in Europe.

History
Founded in 2006 by Alexander Mandl in Brussels, Belgium, ULYZ started out selling just one model of inflatable boat that came in different sizes. Two years later ULYZ created three other models (Starter, Freedom, and Expert) and started selling RIBs to appeal to a wider customer base.

The name ULYZ is derived from Ulysses, a character in ancient Greek literature.

Products 
In June 2010, ULYZ released the new Freedom 300+ as a first step to renew its product line.

Club ULYZ
In August 2010, ULYZ established the Club ULYZ to serve as a community of ULYZ boat owners. It includes a website with forums and blogs and gives members the possibility to talk about their hobbies (fishing, nautical activities), and share their boat experiences, and make suggestions to develop new products.

The Club ULYZ includes such benefits as direct response to product-related questions, a point system that gives discounts on boats and accessories as well as the possibility to help design new boats.

See also
 Inflatable boat
 Rigid-hulled inflatable boat

References

External links
 ULYZ Inflatable Boats Official Website
 Club ULYZ Official Website

Inflatable boats